Blackrod is a civil parish in the Metropolitan Borough of Bolton, Greater Manchester, England.  It contains 13 listed buildings that are recorded in the National Heritage List for England.  All the listed buildings are designated at Grade II, the lowest of the three grades, which is applied to "buildings of national importance and special interest".  The parish is partly residential but mainly rural.  The Leeds and Liverpool Canal passes through the parish and there are five listed buildings associated with it, an aqueduct and four bridges.  The other listed buildings are a former country house and associated structures, farmhouses, a hotel, a church, and a war memorial.


Buildings

References

Citations

Sources

Lists of listed buildings in Greater Manchester
Buildings and structures in the Metropolitan Borough of Bolton
Listed buildings